Jefferson Torresdale Hospital is a non-profit hospital in the Jefferson Health Northeast system, a multi-state non-profit health system now a part of Jefferson Health. The hospital serve as a general hospital of Aria-Jefferson Health and is a Level II trauma center. The hospital contains a helipad for transport.

The hospital uses minimally invasive surgeries and focuses on cancer, cardiology, gynaecology, gastroenterology and dentistry.

History
Jefferson Torresdale Hospital opened in northeast Philadelphia in 1977. It is a 258-bed hospital, and a Level II trauma center. The Torresdale campus has a 1,300 car parking garage.  There are also partner urgent care clinics in the Torresdale area.

Work began in 2013 for a new emergency department and parking garage at the Torresdale campus, at a cost of $37 million. The expansion increased the size of the emergency department to 42 beds. Jefferson Torresdale Hospital is rated high performing in 2 adult procedures and conditions, according to U.S. News & World Report. It is a general medical and surgical facility. It scored high in patient safety, demonstrating commitment to reducing accidents and medical mistakes.

Jefferson Torresdale Hospital was named one of 18 Philadelphia region hospitals that made Healthgrades' top 250 hospitals for 2019.

References

External links
 

Hospitals in Philadelphia
Trauma centers